Auchtermuchty railway station served the village of Auchtermuchty, in Fife, Scotland.

History
Opened by the Fife and Kinross Railway, it became part of the North British Railway in 1865, and so into the London and North Eastern Railway. The line then passed on to the Scottish Region of British Railways on nationalisation in 1948. The station was then closed by British Railways.

References

External links
Station on navigable O. S. map
 RAILSCOT on Fife and Kinross Railway

Disused railway stations in Fife
Former North British Railway stations
Railway stations in Great Britain opened in 1857
Railway stations in Great Britain closed in 1950
1857 establishments in Scotland
1950 disestablishments in Scotland
Auchtermuchty